Olean Railroad Depot is a historic train station located at Olean, Miller County, Missouri.  It was built about 1884, and is a one-story, rectangular frame building with board and batten siding. The building measures 16 feet, 2 inches, by 40 feet, 3 inches. It has a gable roof with a four foot wide overhang supported by brackets all around and the gable ends embellished by decorative truss work.  The depot closed in 1962.

The railroad depot, which lent its name to the surrounding community, was named after Olean, New York, after several other names the town tried to use ran into conflict with other towns on the rail route.

It was added to the National Register of Historic Places in 1993.

References

Railway stations on the National Register of Historic Places in Missouri
Railway stations in the United States opened in 1906
National Register of Historic Places in Miller County, Missouri
Former Missouri Pacific Railroad stations
Railway stations closed in 1962
Former railway stations in Missouri
1884 establishments in Missouri